Saviour Jesus Matriculation Higher Secondary School is a school in Chromepet, Chennai, India. It is located near the Hasthinapuram Bus Terminus.

History 
Saviour Jesus Matriculation Higher Secondary School was founded in the 1970s and continues to be funded by Christian missionaries.

Curriculum 
The school offers instruction given in English as a primary language, with Tamil, Hindi, German, and other languages also being offered.

Christian schools in Tamil Nadu
High schools and secondary schools in Chennai
Schools in Kanchipuram district